Berty Premalal Dissanayake (15 July 1954 – 27 September 2013) was the chief Minister of the North Central Province of Sri Lanka from June 1999 to 2012. He was of the Sri Lanka Freedom Party and part of the United People's Freedom Alliance. He died on 27 September 2013.

Early life
Berty Premalal Dissanayake was a Sri Lankan politician who was active in the political scene in the late 20th century. Born in Anuradhapura in 1954, he received his education in both Anuradhapura and Colombo before entering into active politics in 1977 under the guidance of Kekirawa SLFP councilor A.M. Jinadasa.

Political career
During a difficult political period, Dissanayake played a key role in reviving the Sri Lanka Freedom Party (SLFP) and was eventually appointed as the co-organizer of Kalawewa Constituency by SLFP Leader Sirimavo Bandaranaike. He was instrumental in several political victories, including the 1988 provincial council election and the 1989 general election, where three MPs from the Anuradhapura district were elected to Parliament.

Dissanayake was also a significant figure in the development of the SLFP, serving as the District party leader by 1994. He was awarded the post of Deputy Minister of Industrial Development and later, a senior ministership under President Chandrika Bandaranaike's government.

When establishing the Rajarata Medical College, required the creation of a teaching hospital, Chief Minister Berti Dissanayake mediated it and assigned the Anuradhapura General Hospital to the central government. He also supported transforming the Sri Lanka Institute of Advanced Technology into a Technical college.

Despite facing opposition from within his political party for expressing his own ideologies, Berti was known as a strong figure who challenged the prevailing reactionary hegemony in the North Central and advocated for socialist ideals. During the 2005 presidential election, he actively worked to support Mahinda Rajapaksa's victory, with some organizational efforts in the North Central, Vavuniya, and Trincomalee areas.

References

1954 births
2013 deaths
Sri Lankan Buddhists
Sri Lanka Freedom Party politicians
United People's Freedom Alliance politicians
Members of the North Central Provincial Council
Chief Ministers of North Central Province, Sri Lanka
People from Anuradhapura
Sinhalese politicians